The Front for the Renewal of Social Concord (FRCS), officially registered as the Party of Social Concord is a provincial political party in Argentina, based in Misiones Province. It is the largest party within the eponymous Front for the Renewal of Concord alliance. Its purpoted ideological basis is the so-called "Misionerismo", which stands for further autonomy for Misiones.

The Front was founded by Carlos Rovira, who was governor of Misiones from 1999 to 2007. Since then, the three past governors of the province (Maurice Closs from 2007 to 2015, Hugo Passalacqua from 2015 to 2019, and Oscar Herrera Ahuad since 2019) have belonged to the FRCS.

It is unrelated to the similarly named Renewal Front, with which it had a naming dispute in 2013; the Electoral Justice ruled in favor of the Renewal Front.

References

Provincial political parties in Argentina
Misiones Province
2003 establishments in Argentina
Political parties established in 2003
Peronist parties and alliances in Argentina